Midland County is the name of two counties in the United States:

 Midland County, Michigan 
 Midland County, Texas